Martin Gambles is a professional rugby league footballer who played in the 2000s. He played at representative level for Ireland, and at club level for Gateshead Thunder, Chorley Lynx and Blackpool Panthers.

International honours
Martin Gambles won caps for Ireland while at Blackpool Panthers 2005 2-caps.

References

Chorley Lynx players
Blackpool Panthers players
Newcastle Thunder players
Ireland national rugby league team players
Living people
Place of birth missing (living people)
Year of birth missing (living people)